Wow! Wow! Wubbzy! is an American animated television series that premiered on August 21, 2006, with its pilot episode "A Tale of Tails / Special Delivery", on Noggin. The second season premiered on September 2, 2008. The show aired a total of 52 episodes over two seasons, and two additional specials, with the final special airing on May 1, 2009. Each episode includes a short and a music video.

Series overview

Episodes

Season 1 (2006–2008)

Season 2 (2008–2010)

TV films / specials

References 

Lists of American children's animated television series episodes